Albert Glen "Turk" Edwards (September 28, 1907 – January 12, 1973) was an American professional football player who was a tackle in the National Football League (NFL).  He played his entire career for the Washington Redskins, starting with their first six seasons in Boston, and later became the head coach.  Edwards was inducted into the Pro Football Hall of Fame in 1969.

College career
After graduation from high school in 1928 in Clarkston, Washington, Edwards played college football at Washington State College in nearby Pullman from 1929 to 1931.

He was a member of the Alpha Omicron chapter of Theta Chi fraternity while in college. The nickname "Turk" was given to him by head coach

Professional career
After finishing college, Edwards received offers from three NFL franchises, the recently created Boston Braves, the New York Giants, and the Portsmouth Spartans.  He chose the highest bid: $1,500 for 10 games from the Braves, a team that would later become the Boston Redskins and then move to Washington, D.C. in 1937.

Edwards played for the Braves/Redskins for nine seasons, winning All-NFL honors from major media outlets every year of his career except his last one.

Edwards sustained a career-ending injury during a coin-tossing ceremony prior to a game against the New York Giants in 1940.  After calling the coin toss and shaking hands with college teammate Mel Hein (the Giants' captain), Edwards attempted to pivot around to head back to his sideline.  However, his cleats caught in the grass and his oft-injured knee gave way, ending his season and ultimately his career.

Edwards was inducted into the Pro Football Hall of Fame in 1969, which he described as "certainly the greatest honor." He was introduced at the ceremony by Mel Hein, who said, "The thing I'll remember most about Turk Edwards is that he was a true sportsman, a true gentleman and still is."

Coaching career
Edwards continued with the Redskins as an assistant coach from 1941 to 1945 and then as the head coach from 1946 to 1948.  After 17 consecutive seasons with the Redskins, Edwards retired from professional football.

After football
After retiring from football, Edwards returned to the Pacific Northwest and operated a sporting goods store in Seattle's University District.  In 1961, he moved to Kelso, where he spent 11 years working in the Cowlitz County

Death
After a long illness, Edwards died at age 65 at his Kirkland home on

References

External links
 
 

1907 births
1973 deaths
American football tackles
Boston Braves (NFL) players
Boston Redskins players
Washington Redskins coaches
Washington Redskins players
Washington State Cougars football players
College Football Hall of Fame inductees
Pro Football Hall of Fame inductees
People from Clarkston, Washington
People from Douglas County, Washington
Players of American football from Washington (state)
People from Kelso, Washington
Washington Redskins head coaches